Argamasilla is the name of two different municipalities in the Province of Ciudad Real, Spain
 Argamasilla de Alba
 Argamasilla de Calatrava